Dominique Witten, also known mononymously as Dominique, is an American comedian and actress. She starred in the Adult Swim television series Black Jesus (2014–2019) and Tropical Cop Tales (2019) and was a finalist on the ninth season of the NBC reality competition series Last Comic Standing in 2015.

Life and career
Dominique was raised in Washington, D.C. in a large Black family. Before becoming a comedian, Dominique worked at a post office in Brentwood and at an OB-GYN's office. Her first foray into comedy was at an open mic at the Greenbelt Comedy Connection in Washington; she later quit her day job and moved to the Bronx to pursue a career in stand-up comedy. Throughout her career, Dominique has made appearances on Chappelle's Show, the Tom Joyner Morning Show, and on Def Comedy Jam. She played Shalinka on the Adult Swim sitcom Black Jesus from 2014 to 2019 and starred in Tropical Cop Tales, another Adult Swim comedy series, as Primetime Weeyums in 2019. She was a finalist on the ninth season of the NBC reality competition series Last Comic Standing in 2015.

Filmography

References

Living people
Actresses from Washington, D.C.
Comedians from Washington, D.C.
African-American female comedians
21st-century American actresses
21st-century American comedians
American television actresses
American stand-up comedians
American women comedians
21st-century African-American women
Last Comic Standing contestants
Date of birth missing (living people)
Year of birth missing (living people)